Igor Bychkov may refer to:
Igor Bychkov (footballer) (1958–2009), Russian football coach and former player
Igor Bychkov (pole vaulter) (born 1987), Ukrainian-born pole vaulter who represents Spain
Igor Bychkov (water polo) (born 1994), Russian water polo player